The 2012 Uzbekistan First League was the 21st season of 2nd level football in Uzbekistan since 1992. It is split in an Eastern and Western zone, each featuring 12 teams.

Teams and locations

Note: In 2012 season Dynamo Ghallakor renamed to Ghallakor-Avtomobilchi, Jaykhun Nukus to FK Orol Nukus, Bunyodkor Qo'qon 1912 to Qo'qon 1912 and FC Erkurgan to FC Yoshlik

Competition format
League consists of two regional groups: zone "East" and "West". The season comprises two phases. The first phase consists of a regular home-and-away schedule: each team plays the other teams twice. 
The top eight teams of the first phase from each zone will be merged in one tournament and compete for the championship.  The bottom four teams of each zone after first phase will play each other to remain in first league.

The draw of the 2012 season was held on 29 February 2012.

First League joined Bukhoro-2, Neftchi Khamza, Yuzhanin Navoi, Zaamin from Second League, Lokomotiv BFK and Pakhtakor-2. Imkon-Oltiariq club is replaced by Qo'qon 1912 (former Bunyodkor Qo'qon 1912) and Lokomotiv BFK by FK Atlaschi because of lack of the financial support.

FC Yoshlik is replaced in 2nd phase of championship by FK Registon because of club's debts to its players and coaching staff.

On August 29, 2012 Yuzhanin Navoi renamed to Zarafshon Navoi.

First phase

Zone "East"

Top goalscorers

Last updated: 11 July 2012
Source: Uzbekistan First League

Zone "West"

Top goalscorers

Last updated: 11 July 2012
Source: Uzbekistan First League

Second phase

Championship group

Table before start
League table before start of second phase of championship

League table
The last day matches were played on 30 October 2012. Club's end-season standing after finish of second phase of championship.

Source: soccerway: Uzbekistan First League

Top goalscorers

Last updated: 31 October 2012
Source: Uzbekistan First League

Relegation group

References

External links
Championat.uz: Standings and results
pfl.uz: First league results

Uzbekistan Pro League seasons
2
Uzbek
Uzbek